Chicama District is one of the districts of the Ascope Province in the La Libertad Region in Peru.

Localities
Chiclín
Sausal

See also
Chavimochic
Chicama Valley
Chicama
Puerto Chicama

References

External links
  www.munichicama.gob.pe Official district web site